Omega Hydrae, Latinised from ω Hydrae, is a golden-hued star in the equatorial constellation of Hydra, located to the west-southwest of the brighter star Zeta Hydrae. Based upon an annual parallax shift of just 3.64 mas as seen from Earth, it is located roughly 900 light-years from the Sun. It is faintly visible to the naked eye with an apparent visual magnitude of 5.00.

This is an evolved K-type star with a stellar classification of K2 II-III, which indicates a spectrum showing traits intermediate between the giant and bright giant stages. It is most likely (98% chance) on the horizontal branch, indicating that the star is generating energy through the thermonuclear fusion of helium at its core. With 4.32 times the Sun's mass, it has expanded to around 48 times the radius of the Sun. Omega Hydrae is about 180 million years old and spinning with a leisurely projected rotational velocity of 2.3 km/s.

References

External links

K-type giants
K-type bright giants
Hydra (constellation)
Hydrae, Omega
Hydrae, 18
Durchmusterung objects
077996
044659
3613